R-L151, also known as R-L11 and R1b1a2a1a, is a human Y-chromosome DNA haplogroup; a subclade of the broader haplogroup  R1b (R-M343). It is most often found in males from Western Europe – especially Western France, Northern Spain, Great Britain, and Ireland.

Origin 

This haplogroup is related to the period of Corded Ware or Beaker culture, and possibly founded 3,000 years before our era in the Central part of Europe (possible Bohemia region).

R-L151 is the most populous branch of R-M269, and is found in abundance along the Atlantic coasts of western Europe, especially Aquitaine, Asturias, Basques, Belgium, Brittany, Galicia, England, Ireland (as a whole), the Loire region, the isle of Man,  Northern Portugal, Northern Spain, Scotland, and Wales. It is also found at significant levels in Switzerland and Northern Italy. R-L151 is found at lower frequencies in Poland and Ukraine, as well as many other European countries. Since the early modern era, males emigrating from Europe have introduced significant levels of R-L151 to The Americas and Australasia. 

This human haplogroup has two subclades, the south-western branch, P312/S116, and the north-eastern branch, R1b-S21-U106.

References 

R1b-L11
Genetic history of Europe
Human population genetics
Indo-European genetics
R